Clane RFC is an Irish rugby team based in Clane, County Kildare, playing in Division 3 of the Leinster League. The club colours are black and red. The club has teams at all underage levels, from U7 to U18. The U18 side reached the final of the Leinster League in May 2016, losing 30-27 via a last minute penalty to Portarlington in Donnybrook.

The club shares its grounds with Clane United FC on the Ballinagappa Road.

Honours
 Hosie Cup: 2000/2001, 2001/2002, 2008/2009

References

External links
 Clane RFC

Irish rugby union teams
Rugby clubs established in 1984
Rugby union clubs in County Kildare